Michael Arnold Kamen (April 15, 1948 – November 18, 2003) was an American composer (especially of film scores), orchestral arranger, orchestral conductor, songwriter, and session musician.

Biography

Early life
Michael Arnold Kamen was born in New York City, the second of four sons. His father, Saul Kamen, was a dentist, and his mother, Helen, was a teacher. He was of Jewish heritage.

While attending the High School of Music & Art in New York City, Kamen became friends with Martin Fulterman (later known as Mark Snow), who composed the theme music for The X-Files, among other projects. While studying the oboe, Kamen formed a rock-classical fusion band called New York Rock & Roll Ensemble, together with classmates Fulterman and Dorian Rudnytsky, along with Clifton Nivison and Brian Corrigan of Toms River, New Jersey. The group released five albums from 1968 to 1972 (Self-Titled, Reflections, Faithful Friends, Roll Over & Freedomburger). The group performed in white tie (not tuxedos), as typically worn by classical musicians. In the middle of the concert, Fulterman and Kamen would play an oboe duet. The group backed up friend and classmate Janis Ian in a concert at Alice Tully Hall in late 1967.

After graduating from high school, Kamen attended The Juilliard School, in Manhattan, New York City.

Kamen's early work concentrated on ballets before extending to Hollywood with the score for The Next Man in 1976, and then to pop and rock arranging, collaborating with Pink Floyd on their album The Wall.

Career in popular music
Kamen became a highly sought-after arranger in the realms of pop and rock music. His contemporaries in this field included Academy Award winner Anne Dudley, Richard Niles, and Nick Ingman.

His successes include his work with Pink Floyd, David Gilmour and Roger Waters (he is one of the few people invited to work with both former Pink Floyd members, even after their acrimonious split), as well as Queen (orchestration on "Who Wants to Live Forever"), Eric Clapton (on Edge of Darkness), Roger Daltrey, Aerosmith (live orchestral version of "Dream On" for MTV), Kiss, Tom Petty, Bon Jovi, David Bowie, Bryan Ferry, Eurythmics, Queensrÿche, Rush, Metallica (on the song "Nothing Else Matters" and their live album, S&M), Def Leppard, Herbie Hancock, Tim Curry, The Cranberries, Bryan Adams, Jim Croce, Coldplay, Sting, Guns N' Roses (on their performance of "November Rain" on the MTV Video Music Awards) and Kate Bush. For Bush, Kamen delivered an orchestral backing for "Moments of Pleasure" from The Red Shoes album, substantially building upon a simple piano theme Bush had composed. In this instance and many others, he conducted the orchestra personally for the recording. In 1984, two years after moving to London, Kamen had similarly heightened the effect of a pop recording for the Eurythmics "Here Comes the Rain Again", that score relying as much on his compositional skills as his arranging talents.

In 1990, Kamen joined many other guests for Roger Waters' performance of The Wall in Berlin, and led the National Philharmonic Orchestra during the 24 Nights sessions with Eric Clapton the following year.

Lenny Kravitz recorded a cover of "Fields of Joy", a song co-written by Kamen and Hal Fredricks, on his 1991 CD Mama Said.

In 2002, Kamen took part in the Concert for George as strings conductor.

Kamen had a successful partnership with Bryan Adams and "Mutt" Lange composing scores and songs. The ballad "(Everything I Do) I Do It for You" for the 1991 film Robin Hood: Prince of Thieves was the number one song that year worldwide. Other songs were "All for Love" for the movie The Three Musketeers in 1993, and "Have You Ever Really Loved a Woman?" the song from the film Don Juan DeMarco, in 1994.

Film and television career
Kamen wrote eleven ballets, a saxophone concerto and an electric guitar concerto (with Japanese guitarist Tomoyasu Hotei as a soloist, though originally performed by Eric Clapton). Additionally, he wrote a commissioned work, "Quintet", for the Canadian Brass. He also provided scores for the films The Dead Zone, For Queen and Country, Polyester, Brazil, Someone To Watch Over Me, The Adventures of Baron Munchausen, The Three Musketeers, Highlander, X-Men, Robin Hood: Prince of Thieves, Licence to Kill, the Lethal Weapon series, the first three films of the Die Hard series, Mr. Holland's Opus, The Iron Giant, Splitting Heirs, Frequency and many others. He also scored both the From the Earth to the Moon and Band of Brothers series on HBO. The trailer for the 2007 release Bee Movie, the 2008 release Nim's Island, the 2008 release WALL-E, and the 2014 release Mr. Peabody & Sherman featured Kamen's "Central Services / The Office" from his score to Brazil (1985).

In television, Kamen composed music for two series of The Manageress produced by Glenn Wilhide, at Zed Productions for Channel 4, and Joan Bakewell's interview series Memento in 1993, also at Zed Productions for Channel 4, but perhaps his best known work was on the 1985 BBC Television serial Edge of Darkness, on which he collaborated with Eric Clapton to write the score. The pair were awarded with a British Academy Television Award for Best Original Television Music for their work and performed the main movie theme with the National Philharmonic Orchestra at the Royal Albert Hall of London in 1990 and 1991. In 1994, Kamen conducted an orchestration of the Who's music for Roger Daltrey's 50th birthday concert series entitled A Celebration: The Music of Pete Townshend and The Who which was subsequently released on CD and DVD.

Kamen was nominated for two Academy Awards and won three Grammy Awards, two Golden Globes, two Ivor Novello Awards, an Annie Award, and an Emmy.

Later years
His involvement with Mr. Holland's Opus, a film about a frustrated composer who finds fulfillment as a high school music teacher, led Kamen to create The Mr. Holland's Opus Foundation in 1996. The foundation supports music education through the donation of new and refurbished musical instruments to underserved school and community music programs and individual students in the United States. In 2005 the foundation created an emergency fund for schools and students affected by Hurricane Katrina.

In 1998, Kamen composed and conducted the soundtrack for What Dreams May Come. Produced by James Seymour Brett, the score was initially set to be composed by Ennio Morricone. The Italian composer had initially completed and recorded a full score for the film but, after editorial changes were made, his score was rejected and Kamen was hired in his place. Short on time, Kamen took the song "Beside You" from his New York Rock Ensemble's album Roll Over and adapted it as the movie's main musical theme.

Between April 21 and 22, 1999, Kamen worked with the heavy metal band Metallica, along with The San Francisco Symphony, to record a two-day concert that was held at The Berkeley Community Theatre in Berkeley, California. The concert performance, titled S&M by Metallica, which is an acronym for "Symphony and Metallica", referencing the collaboration of the two artists, was released on November 23, 1999, on CD, DVD, and VHS formats, debuting at #2 on the Billboard 200, subsequently reaching multi-platinum status by 2001. Later that year, Kamen and Metallica won a Grammy Award For Best Rock Instrumental Performance for the S&M track titled "The Call Of Ktulu".

In 2001 and 2002, Kamen performed with David Gilmour at Gilmour's semi-unplugged shows at the Royal Festival Hall, playing piano and cor anglais. The 2001 concert and highlights from 2002 were released on DVD as David Gilmour in Concert.

In 2002, Kamen, along with Julian Lloyd Webber, Dame Evelyn Glennie, and Sir James Galway launched the Music Education Consortium in the UK. The consortium's efforts led to the injection of £332 million for music education in the UK. He was also commissioned to write a piece for the opening ceremonies of the Winter Olympics in Salt Lake City.

His last recorded work appeared on Bryan Adams's album Room Service where he played the oboe and wrote the orchestration to "I Was Only Dreamin'". Kamen had also completed the charts for accompaniment to two songs on Kate Bush's album Aerial, which was released in April 2005.

Health and death
Kamen was diagnosed with multiple sclerosis in 1997. He died in London, England, from a heart attack on November 18, 2003, at age 55.

Legacy

In 2004, when Annie Lennox accepted the Academy Award for Best Original Song (for "Into the West" from The Lord of the Rings: The Return of the King), she dedicated her achievement to the memory of Kamen.

The 2004 films Boo, Zino & the Snurks (also known as Back to Gaya) and First Daughter, which Kamen was working on at the time of his death, were dedicated to his memory.

David Gilmour's 2006 album On an Island was dedicated to the memory of Kamen and longtime Pink Floyd manager Steve O'Rourke.

Film scores

Concert works
 Concerto for Saxophone (1990)
 24 Nights (1991)
 Live in Hyde Park (1997)
 Guitar Concerto (with Tomoyasu Hotei) (1998)
 S&M (1999) with Metallica
 The New Moon in the Old Moon's Arms (2001)
 Quintet (Canadian Brass) (2002)

References

External links
 
 
 Film Composer Tributes – Michael Kamen
 Michael Kamen at Soundtrackguide.net
 Michael Kamen interview (in french) at UnderScores : Musique & Cinéma

1948 births
2003 deaths
20th-century American composers
20th-century American conductors (music)
20th-century American male musicians
Aardman Animations people
American expatriates in the United Kingdom
American film score composers
American male conductors (music)
American male film score composers
American male songwriters
American music arrangers
American oboists
American people of Czech descent
American people of English-Jewish descent
American session musicians
Animated film score composers
Annie Award winners
Atco Records artists
Composers from New York City
Concert band composers
Decca Records artists
DreamWorks Animation people
Georges Delerue Award winners
Grammy Award winners
Ivor Novello Award winners
Jewish American film score composers
Juilliard School alumni
JVC Records artists
La-La Land Records artists
Male oboists
Musicians from New York City
People with multiple sclerosis
Sony Pictures Animation people
The High School of Music & Art alumni
Varèse Sarabande Records artists